Pohádky z mechu a kapradí (English: The Tales of Moss and Fern) is a Czechoslovakian animated children's television series produced from 1968 to 1979. The series focuses on the adventures of two forest people named Křemílek and Vochomůrka, often dealing with certain problems. It was made by Kratky Film Prague and their animation studio Bratři v triku.

History
The series first premiered on Czechoslovak Television on October 6, 1968. The first season was shot in black and white, with the remainder of the series being shot in color. Due to its success, a second season spanning 13 episodes was produced in 1970.

In 2014, Česká televize announced plans to colorize the first season by 2017. However, only the first 7 episodes were colorized and shown during 2018, with a 16:9 format being added as well.

Episodes
Kterak seřídili hodiny s jednou ručičkou
Otvírání studánky
Kterak pudrovali jahody
Jak rozškrtli ohnivého mužíčka
Jak pekli a upekli koláč
Jak dostali račí sklíčko
Jak hostili myšáka
Jak rozbili medákovi sluníčkovou basu
Jak našli poklad
Jak vezli na sáňkách vejce
Kterak pekli kaštany
Jak přivedli domů světýlkovou vílu
Jak zpívali koledu
Jak Křemílek a Vochomůrka zasadili semínko
Jak Křemílek a Vochomůrka vařili šípkový čaj
Jak Křemílek a Vochomůrka měli hodiny se zlou kukačkou
Jak Křemílek a Vochomůrka šili kalhoty
Jak Křemílek a Vochomůrka nevěděli, co se děje
Jak Křemílka a Vochomůrku málem popadl drak
Jak Křemílek a Vochomůrka měli trápení s rakem
Jak Křemílek a Vochomůrka zabloudili v bedlovém lese
Jak šel Křemílek a Vochomůrka na pařezy
Jak si Křemílek a Vochomůrka ani nelízli povidel
Jak Křemílek a Vochomůrka hráli maličké víle
Jak Křemílek a Vochomůrka jedli kaši
Jak Křemílek a Vochomůrka přišli ke dvěma pěkným panenkám
Jak Křemílek a Vochomůrka šli pro první jarní pochutnání
Jak Křemílek a Vochomůrka honili basu
Jak Křemílek a Vochomůrka pozdravili myšku Filipku
Jak Křemílek a Vochomůrka našli pod borůvkou housličky
Jak si Křemílek a Vochomůrka udělali houpačku
Jak Křemílek a Vochomůrka učesali vílu
Jak Křemílek s Vochomůrkou vezli čtyři velké kameny
Jak Křemílek a Vochomůrka seděli na vajíčkách
Jak Křemílek a Vochomůrka měli trápení s drozdem
Jak Křemílek a Vochomůrka vystřelili z kanónu
Jak Křemílek s Vochomůrkou zatopili až druhou sirkou
Jak Křemílek a Vochomůrka hledali pět peněz
Jak Křemílek a Vochomůrka udělali obrovi píšťalku

References

External links

Czech animated television series
Czech children's television series
Czechoslovak television series
1968 Czechoslovak television series debuts
1960s Czechoslovak television series
1979 Czechoslovak television series endings
Czechoslovak Television original programming